Kubuta Airfield  is a rural airstrip serving Kubuta, an Inkhundla in the Shiselweni Region of Eswatini.

See also
Transport in Eswatini
List of airports in Eswatini

References

External links
 OpenStreetMap - Kubuta Airstrip
 OurAirports - Kubuta
 FallingRain - Kubuta
 
 Google Earth

Airports in Eswatini